The 1873 Suburbs of Nelson by-election was a by-election held  on 14 May 1873 in the  electorate in Nelson during the 5th New Zealand Parliament.

The by-election was caused by the resignation of the incumbent, Ralph Richardson. The by-election was won by Andrew Richmond. He was opposed by Charles Elliott. Fedor Kelling had withdrawn in favour of Richmond.

Results

References

 

Nelson Suburbs 1873
1873 elections in New Zealand
May 1873 events
Politics of the Nelson Region